The Birds, original Nynorsk title Fuglane, is a novel by Norwegian author Tarjei Vesaas. It was first released in 1957, and has been translated into several languages, including English.

Synopsis
The story revolves around the inner world of Matthew, who is mentally challenged and lives with his sister.

Legacy
Being regarded as one of Vesaas' most important novels, it was included in the major Norwegian publisher Gyldendal Norsk Forlag's 30 picks for Norway's national literature both in 1967 and 1996. In 2007, the Norwegian Festival of Literature included it in a best-of list of 25 Norwegian literary works, picked by a jury of ten.

Film
The 1968 Polish motion picture Matthew's Days by Witold Leszczyński was based on the novel.

The 2019 Norwegian film The Birds (Fuglane) directed by Anders T. Andersen was based on the novel.

Translations
 The Birds / translated by Torbjørn Støverud and Michael Barnes. London: Peter Owen Publishers, 2013. - 224 pp. -  (paperback)

References

20th-century Norwegian novels
1957 Norwegian novels
Norwegian novels adapted into films
Novels by Tarjei Vesaas